Matthew John Lowton (born 9 June 1989) is an English professional footballer who plays as a right back for  club Huddersfield Town on loan from Burnley.

Lowton joined Sheffield United's academy in 2004. He spent time on loan with both non-league Sheffield and Hungarian side Ferencváros before making the break into United's first team in 2010. He played regularly for two seasons before being sold to Aston Villa in 2012. After three seasons and 72 Premier League appearances, he joined Burnley in 2015.

Career

Sheffield United

Lowton was born in Chesterfield, Derbyshire. He joined Sheffield United aged fifteen after a spell with Leeds United and progressed through Sheffield United's youth set up to reserve level, converting from a full-back to a central defensive role in the process. After spending a spell on loan at Sheffield FC in 2008, in January 2009, Lowton went out on loan to Sheffield United's Hungarian sister club Ferencváros, along with fellow reserve player Sam Wedgbury, to get first-team experience. He made his debut in the Hungarian League Cup the next month, making twenty appearances for the club.

Back in the Championship, Lowton found himself on the fringes of the first team and duly made his Blades debut in a 1–1 draw with Cardiff City at the end of March 2010, coming on as a late substitute, before making his full debut for the club in the final match of the season.

The following season, Lowton started Sheffield United's opening day fixture, away to Cardiff City, but was issued with a straight red card. Despite this setback, he returned to the first-team picture and was rewarded with a new contract at the end of September. Lowton continued a run of substitute appearances and rewarded United's faith by scoring his first senior goal in mid-October, netting in a 3–3 home draw with Burnley. Lowton played regularly for the remainder of the season, scoring four goals in all, but couldn't prevent the club from slipping to relegation.

With the Blades in League One at the time, Lowton remained a key player and was rewarded with an extended contract in August 2011, making 55 appearances in total for the Blades during the following season and scoring six goals.

Aston Villa
Lowton completed a move to Aston Villa in July 2012 for an undisclosed fee, believed to be £3 million, becoming Paul Lambert's second signing as Villa manager, and made his debut on 18 August 2012, in the Premier League against West Ham United. On 15 September, Lowton scored his first league goal for Villa in a 2–0 home win against Swansea City. On 19 July 2013, Lowton signed a new four-year deal to keep him at Aston Villa until the summer of 2017.

Burnley
On 22 June 2015, Burnley secured the signing of Lowton on a three-year deal for an undisclosed fee believed to be around £1 million plus add-ons. Lowton made his debut for Burnley on 20 October, as an 84th-minute substitute against Nottingham Forest; his first start came against Charlton Athletic on 19 December. His first and only goal of the season was Burnley's fourth in a 5–0 rout of Milton Keynes Dons on 12 January 2016. Lowton would make 27 appearances in his maiden season at Burnley, all in the League, as Burnley won the Championship title and earned promotion to the Premier League.

Huddersfield Town (loan)
On 4 January 2023, Lowton joined fellow EFL Championship side Huddersfield Town on loan for the remainder of the 2022–23 season.

Career statistics

Honours
Burnley
Football League Championship: 2015–16

References

External links

Profile at the Burnley F.C. website

1989 births
Living people
Footballers from Chesterfield
English footballers
Association football defenders
Sheffield United F.C. players
Sheffield F.C. players
Ferencvárosi TC footballers
Aston Villa F.C. players
Burnley F.C. players
Huddersfield Town A.F.C. players
Northern Premier League players
Nemzeti Bajnokság I players
English Football League players
Premier League players
English expatriate footballers
English expatriate sportspeople in Hungary
Expatriate footballers in Hungary